This is the list of Belgian Senators from 1991 till 1995.

Election results (24 November 1991)

Directly elected senators

Antwerp

Brabant

Bruges

Hasselt-Tongeren-Maaseik

Liege

Luxembourg

Malines-Turnhout

Namur

Coopted senators

Dutch language group (16)

French language group (11)

References

1990s in Belgium